Wilburton is a small village of just over 1,000 inhabitants, situated in Cambridgeshire, England. It is 6 miles south west of Ely. While nominally an agricultural village, many of the inhabitants work in Cambridge, Ely or London.

History

Wilburton is a parish of around 800 acres lying on the important medieval route from Earith to Stretham, and extending south to the River Great Ouse. As much of the land in the region is fenland, the village's position on the ridge between Stretham and Haddenham at the southern end of the Isle of Ely was important in its growth and success. Listed as Wilburhtun in 970 and Wilbertone in the Domesday Book, the name "Wilburton" means "Farmstead or village of a woman called Wilburh".

The village contains a number of old buildings, and was described in the 19th century as "very neat and contains some excellent houses".  These include the Burystead (the former manor house, built c.1600), one of the few surviving half-timbered houses in the region, and the Victoria Place row of cottages. For the last few hundred years, the Pell family were the prominent local landowners, sponsoring the Ely and St Ives Railway in the late 19th century. Wilburton railway station, built in 1866, has been open for goods trains only since 1931.

Church
The parish church, dedicated to St Peter consists of a chancel, north vestry and organ chamber, a nave, north chapel, south porch, and west tower. The chancel arch and tower date from the 13th century and the extensive rebuilding in the second half of the 15th century produced the chancel, vestry, nave, and porch. The organ chamber and north chapel were added in the late 19th century. The three-storey tower contains five bells, all dating from the 17th century.

Village life
Their village is home to an Elizabethan manor house, a shop, and a garden centre. There is one public house, The King's Head. There is also a hall called St Peter's Hall that is used for events by the local community, such as school plays, wedding receptions, and after-school clubs. Adjoining St Peter's Hall is a social club. The village holds a fireworks display around Guy Fawkes night and two annual beer festivals.

Wilburton is home to two amateur football teams, Wilburton Blades and Wilburton Albion.

Wilburton Fc was formed in 2006 by two local residents after both previous teams folded. The club grew into having a first and reserve team with having over 50 players associated to the club. The club ran for over 6 years turning from bottom of the table to competing for the league and winning several Invitational cups and trophies during its 6-year history. Well known local football player William Ludbrooke made a big impact for the club scoring over 80 competitive goals and winning several awards along the way within the associated leagues. After enjoying several successes, the team also played at Carrow Rd, Norwich on 3 occasions and at MK Dons. In 2012 the club chairman and manager retired with the reserve manager leaving shortly after. Most of the first team players then moved over to Stretham with the club then coming to an end.

However, opening in September 2018, Wilburton Football Academy will offer training to children aged 4 to 6 to take part in matches with other teams from the county. It will be located at the main recreational ground.

Wilburton-Wallington Phase 
The Wilburton-Wallington Phase is the name given by archaeologists to a metalworking stage of the Bronze Age in Britain spanning the period between c. 1140 BC and c. 1020 BC. The Wilburton complex was present in the south of Britain and the Wallington (Northumberland) complex in the north. Both are characterised by the introduction of copper-lead-tin alloys in bronze making and by the manufacture of leaf-shaped slashing swords, socketed spearheads secured to a shaft with a peg, horse-bits and socketed axes. It is paralleled by the Poldar industries in Scotland and the Roscommon industries in Ireland as well as being linked with the Urnfield A2-B1 in South Germany. It is preceded in Britain by the Penard Period, and followed by the Blackmoor Period.

See also
Doghouse Grove nature reserve, south of the village
Grunty Fen, a former parish, now amalgamated with the village

References

External links

  Wilburton Website
  Wilburton Village Website

Villages in Cambridgeshire
Civil parishes in Cambridgeshire
East Cambridgeshire District